Civic Stadium may refer to:

 Civic Stadium (Eugene, Oregon) in Eugene, Oregon

Other places formerly called Civic Stadium:
 Oshawa Civic Auditorium in Oshawa, Ontario 
 Ivor Wynne Stadium in Hamilton, Ontario 
 Providence Park in Portland, Oregon
 War Memorial Stadium (Buffalo, New York) in Buffalo, New York